The Marriage Feast At Cana is a painting that was until recently attributed to Hieronymus Bosch. The painting resides at the Museum Boijmans Van Beuningen in Rotterdam, the Netherlands.
Several copies exist of this picture.  Until recently the copy in Boijmans has been considered the original.  Dendrochronological analysis, however, has now proven conclusively that it cannot have been painted earlier than 1550.

Provenance
A wedding-feast by or after Bosch belonged to the Rubens collection in Antwerp.
The painting at Boijmans was bought in Antwerp by an English painter.  It has been sawed down and the upper corners subsequently shaped into steps.  At the time it showed a portrait and only when the overpainting was removed did the tempera painting of the wedding come to light.  “What was revealed was a poor, not to say, wholly disfigured, painting”.

References

Sources

16th-century paintings
Paintings by Hieronymus Bosch
Paintings depicting Jesus
Paintings in the collection of the Museum Boijmans Van Beuningen
Paintings of the Virgin Mary
Dogs in art
Food and drink paintings